Carmi Air Force Station (ADC ID: SM-137) is a closed United States Air Force General Surveillance Radar station. It was closed in 1957.

History
Carmi Air Force Station was initially part of Phase II of the Air Defense Command Mobile Radar program. The Air Force
approved this expansion of the Mobile Radar program on October 23, 1952.  Radars in this network were designated “SM.”

Prior to 1955, the site was used as farmland. The 12.5-acre site was conveyed to the United States by Warranty Deed, dated 19 March 1955, and to be under the control of the U.S. Air Force.  The station became operational on 1 July 1955 when the 704th Aircraft Control and Warning Squadron was moved to Carmi from Willow Run AFS, MI.  The squadron operated an AN/TPS-1D radar set.  The station functioned as a "slave site" ("manned gap-filler") to the 784th Aircraft Control and Warning Squadron at Snow Mountain AFS, KY.

Closed due to budgetary cuts on 1 November 1957. It was scheduled to become an unmanned gap-filler radar site P-70A, but did not.  On 5 September 1958, the Air Force declared the 12.5-acre site excess and transferred it, along with all buildings and personal property located on the site at the time of transfer to the General Services Administration (GSA).

GSA conveyed the site to Wayne Industries, Inc. by Quitclaim Deed dated 1 December 1958, which included all buildings and personal property located on the site. GSA took back a Purchase Money Mortgage from the Grantee effective 10 October 1958. A perpetual easement for ingress and egress to maintain and operate power lines and other utility services was maintained by the Government. In March 1959 Wayne Industries, Inc. was declared in default on the mortgage note and subsequently foreclosure proceeding followed.

On 22 January 1960, GSA transferred the site, by Assignment of Purchase Money Order, to Carmi Industrial Sites Corporation, then known as Carmi Industrial Association. They rented out the structures for warehouse storage, auto repair garages, and a machine shop. The northern portion of the property was being rented for agricultural purposes.  Most of the former USAF buildings remain today, many appear to be overgrown with vegetation and deteriorating.

Air Force units and assignments

Units
 704th Aircraft Control and Warning Squadron, Assigned on 1 July 1955
 Activated at Willow Run AFS (P-23), MI, 1 March 1955
 Inactivated on 1 November 1957

Assignments
 4706th Air Defense Wing, 1 July 1955
 58th Air Division, 1 March 1956 – 1 November 1957

See also
 List of USAF Aerospace Defense Command General Surveillance Radar Stations

References

  Cornett, Lloyd H. and Johnson, Mildred W., A Handbook of Aerospace Defense Organization  1946 - 1980,  Office of History, Aerospace Defense Center, Peterson AFB, CO (1980).
 Winkler, David F. & Webster, Julie L., Searching the Skies, The Legacy of the United States Cold War Defense Radar Program,  US Army Construction Engineering Research Laboratories, Champaign, IL (1997).
 Information for Carmi AFS, IL

Installations of the United States Air Force in Illinois
Radar stations of the United States Air Force
Aerospace Defense Command military installations
Military installations established in 1956
Military installations closed in 1957
1956 establishments in Illinois
1957 disestablishments in Illinois